This was a new event on the 2013 ITF Women's Circuit.

Aleksandra Krunić won the title, defeating Stéphanie Foretz Gacon in the final, 1–6, 6–4, 6–3.

Seeds

Main draw

Finals

Top half

Bottom half

References 
 Main draw

Trabzon Cup (1) - Singles
Trabzon Cup
2013 in Turkish tennis